Kody Alec Clemens (born May 15, 1996) is an American professional baseball infielder and outfielder for the Philadelphia Phillies of Major League Baseball (MLB). He has previously played in MLB for the Detroit Tigers. Clemens is the son of seven time Cy Young Award winner Roger Clemens.

Clemens played college baseball for the Texas Longhorns. He was selected by the Tigers with the 79th overall pick of the 2018 MLB draft. He made his major league debut for the Tigers in 2022, and was traded to Philadelphia after the 2022 season.

Amateur career
Clemens attended Memorial High School in Houston, Texas. Playing for the school's baseball team, he batted .553 during his senior season. He was named first team all-district selection in 2013 and was a Perfect Game Honorable Mention for high school in 2013 and 2014. He committed to the University of Texas at Austin to play college baseball for the Texas Longhorns.

As a freshman in 2016, batted with a .242 batting average and five home runs. As a sophomore in 2017, Clemens underwent Tommy John surgery. However, Clemens did play as the team's designated hitter. Clemens had a breakout junior season batting .352 with 23 home runs. These stats earned him Big 12 player of the week. On June 7, 2018, Clemens was named a finalist for the Golden Spikes Award and the Dick Howser Trophy.

Professional career

Detroit Tigers

Draft and minor leagues
The Detroit Tigers selected Clemens in the third round, with the 79th overall pick, in the 2018 Major League Baseball draft. He received a $600,000 signing bonus and made his professional debut with the West Michigan Whitecaps of the Class A Midwest League. He was promoted to the Lakeland Flying Tigers of the Class A-Advanced Florida State League in August. In 52 total games between the two clubs, Clemens slashed .288/.365/.450 with five home runs and 20 RBIs. Clemens began 2019 with Lakeland, before being promoted to the Erie SeaWolves at the end of the season. Over 128 games between both teams, he batted .231/.310/.397 with 12 home runs and 63 RBIs.

In July 2020, during the COVID-19 pandemic, Clemens signed on to play for Team Texas of the Constellation Energy League, a makeshift four-team independent league, for the season. He was subsequently named MVP of his team. Clemens spent the 2021 season with the Triple-A Toledo Mud Hens, slashing .247/.312/.466 with 18 home runs and 59 RBIs in 97 games. He was selected to the 40-man roster following the season on November 19, 2021. Clemens returned to Toledo for the start of the 2022 season.

Major leagues
On May 30, 2022, the Tigers promoted Clemens to the major leagues when Robbie Grossman was placed on the injured list. On June 13, 2022, Clemens got his first hit of his career, a single off of Lance Lynn of the Chicago White Sox.   On June 15, Clemens made his major league pitching debut and gave up one run in one inning of work. On June 25, 2022, Clemens hit a three-run, go-ahead home run off of Joe Mantiply of the Arizona Diamondbacks. This was his first home run in his career. Clemens was optioned back down to Toledo on July 12 but recalled on July 21.  Clemens recorded his first MLB career strikeout on September 6, 2022 against the 2021 American League MVP Shohei Ohtani of the Los Angeles Angels.

Philadelphia Phillies 
On January 7, 2023, the Tigers traded Clemens and pitcher Gregory Soto to the Philadelphia Phillies for outfielder Matt Vierling, infielder Nick Maton, and catcher Donny Sands.

Personal life
Clemens is the son of former MLB pitcher Roger Clemens. Clemens has three brothers: Koby, Kory, and Kacy. Koby also played baseball professionally. All four have names starting with the letter "K", which in baseball scorekeeping designates a strikeout.

References

External links

Texas Longhorns bio

1996 births
Living people
Baseball players from Houston
Major League Baseball second basemen
Detroit Tigers players
Texas Longhorns baseball players
West Michigan Whitecaps players
Lakeland Flying Tigers players
Erie SeaWolves players
Toledo Mud Hens players
All-American college baseball players
Memorial High School (Hedwig Village, Texas) alumni